William S. Eisenhart III (August 24, 1946 – June 25, 1995) was an American writer on art.

Biography
Eisenhart was born in York, Pennsylvania. He attended Exeter, and then Princeton University where he majored in English, and then moved to Manhattan in 1970. He worked on productions of the Nederlands Dans Theater and the Opera Theater of St. Louis. His biography The World of Donald Evans won the American Book Award in 1982.

Eisenhart died in New York City at the age of 48 on June 25, 1995, as the result of a fall from the roof of his home.

References

External links
The world of Donald Evans, Willy Eisenhart, Donald Evans, Abbeville Press (1994)
Man of iron: a portrait of Willy Eisenhart for piano, Virgil Thomson, Willy Eisenhart, G. Schirmer (1978; a musical portrait of Willy Eisenhart)

American art critics
American art historians
American male biographers
Princeton University alumni
1946 births
1995 deaths
Writers from York, Pennsylvania
Writers from New York City
Phillips Exeter Academy alumni
20th-century American biographers
Journalists from New York City
Journalists from Pennsylvania
20th-century American male writers
Historians from New York (state)
20th-century American journalists
American male journalists